Richard Frederick Lack (March 26, 1928 - September 27, 2009) was an American artist, educator, and writer. He is known for his work in all major genres of traditional art. He founded Atelier Lack in 1969 to train students interested in learning the skills necessary to create fine representational art, and he initiated the use of the term “Classical Realism” as an artistic designation. He trained thirty-one artists who taught or opened ateliers.

Background and education 
Richard Frederick Lack was born in Minneapolis, Minnesota, on March 26, 1928, the only child of Frederick and Mildred Lack. He grew up among primarily Scandinavian immigrant families living near Lake Nokomis in the southern part of the city, an area made famous by Longfellow’s poem The Song of Hiawatha. He was interested in art from an early age through the illustrations of N. C. Wyeth and Donn P. Crane.

Richard Lack studied with Boston artist R. H. Ives Gammell from 1950 to 1956. In 1957 he returned to Minneapolis with his wife, Katherine. They purchased a home in Glen Lake and Lack built a studio designed to simulate the lighting conditions recommended in the notebooks of Leonardo da Vinci. In 1958 he received a grant from the John F. and Anna Lee Stacy Scholarship Fund.

Career
During his career Lack created work in most of the major genres of Western art:  portrait, genre, still-life, landscape, printmaking, and works based on myth, history, and the psychology of C. G. Jung.

 
 

Lack was a highly sought after portrait artist and he painted many notable figures, among them six portraits for the Kennedy family in Hyannis Port, MA, a portrait for England’s sixth Eardley-Wilmot Baronet, and Minnesota Governors Wendell Anderson and Albert Quie.

Teaching
In 1969 Richard Lack founded Atelier Lack, Inc., a small, non-profit studio school of drawing and painting with an apprentice program based on the teaching methods of the nineteenth century French ateliers and the Boston impressionists. During his teaching career he taught ninety full-time students. He retired from teaching in 1992 due to ill health.

Classical realism 
In 1981 Vern G. Swanson, director of the Springville Museum of Art in Springville, Utah, invited Lack and his colleagues to organize an exhibition of their work that would originate at his museum and bear the title “The Other Twentieth Century.” Vern Swanson asked Lack to come up with a term that would differentiate the realism of the heirs of the Boston tradition from that of other representational artists. For a solo exhibition in 1974 Lack had used the term “classical realism” to describe his work.  It was difficult, however, to find a term that would characterize the work of a diverse group of painters, even within a specific tradition. Although he was reluctant to use it, he settled on “classical realism” to describe the work of the artists represented in the exhibition.  The title of the show became “Classical Realism: The Other Twentieth Century.” The exhibition opened at the Springville Museum of Art, then travelled to the Amarillo Museum of Art and closed at the Maryhill Museum of Art in Goldendale, WA. 

During his later years Lack devoted most of his time and energy to painting a series of large works based on Jungian psychology, which depict man’s inner journey toward individuation and psychological wholeness.

Author and articles 
Lack was the author of many articles on art including the influential booklet On the Training of Painters With Notes on the Atelier Program. He and his wife edited the book Realism in Revolution: The Art of the Boston School. Richard was the co-founder of the Classical Realism Quarterly, the forerunner to the Classical Realism Journal. He was also the co-founder of The American Society of Classical Realism and, along with Stephen Gjertson and Don Koestner, a founding member of its Guild of Artists. More than one hundred fifty articles were written about him and his work including “Richard Lack’s System of Training Painters,” American Artist, Summer 1971 and “Is it Radical to Paint like Rembrandt?,” Twin Cities, July 1983. Richard was listed in Who's Who in American Art, Who's Who in International Art and Antiques, Who's Who in the Midwest, Who’s Who in American Education, and International Biographies.

Exhibitions and awards 
Richard Lack exhibited in eighty-seven solo and group exhibitions throughout the United States. He and his work won twenty-nine medals and awards. The last exhibition of Lack’s work during his lifetime was “Distinguished Company: A Retrospective Exhibition of Works by Richard Lack, Don Koestner, and Stephen Gjertson.” It opened in January 2009. He died late in the evening on September 22, 2009, at the age of eighty-one. He was interred in a private ceremony at Fort Snelling National Cemetery. On November first the Lack family held a well-attended public tribute, memorial service, and exhibition at the University of Minnesota Landscape Arboretum in Chaska, Minnesota.

References 

1928 births
2009 deaths
20th-century American artists
20th-century American educators
20th-century American writers
Artists from Minneapolis
Educators from Minnesota
Writers from Minneapolis